Chung Tai Chan Monastery is a Buddhist monastery located in Puli Township, Nantou County, Taiwan. It is the headquarters of Chung Tai Shan, an international Chan Buddhist order. Widely admired as an architectural masterpiece because of the mountain monastery's more modern look, the temple is second only to Fo Guang Shan's monastery in physical size and in the number of ordained disciples.

History
Construction began in 1990 and ended with completion in 2001. From 2001 until 2006 it was the world's tallest Buddhist building and has been the world's tallest Buddhist temple since 2001.

Architecture
The temple sits in a 25 hectares of complex. It was designed by Taiwanese-based Chinese architect C. Y. Lee and constructed with a cost of US$650 million.

See also
 Buddhism in Taiwan
 Chung Tai Shan
 Four Great Mountains (Taiwan)
 Ocean Sky Chan Monastery, Philippines
 List of temples in Taiwan
 List of tourist attractions in Taiwan

References

External links 

 Chung Tai Chan Monastery website

2001 establishments in Taiwan
21st-century Buddhist temples
Buddhist monasteries in Taiwan
Buildings and structures in Nantou County
Buddhist temples in Taiwan
Chan temples
Chung Tai Shan
Tourist attractions in Nantou County